The Catetinho was the first official workplace of the President of Brazil Juscelino Kubitschek.

History

The name Catetinho comes from the then official residence of the president, the Catete Palace. Oscar Niemeyer's project, was built in just 10 days, in November 1956. It is a simple building, made of wood, and known as "Palácio de Tábuas" ("Planks Palace"). 

It was planned without comfort or official honours, so that the President didn't distance himself from the workers, who lived in shacks and tents.

See also

 List of Oscar Niemeyer works

References

External links

Palaces in Brasília
Presidential palaces in Brazil
Oscar Niemeyer buildings
Tourist attractions in Brasília